Paul A. Levine (31 December 1956 – 28 October 2019) was an American–Swedish Holocaust and genocide historian, co-author of a widely used Swedish textbook on the subject.

Education 
1996- Doctor of Philosophy, Uppsala University, Department of History

Career as researcher 
He was a co-founder of Uppsala University's Hugo Valentin Centre for Holocaust & Genocide Studies, and the author of many publications on Holocaust history and memory. After receiving his doctorate in 1996 with the monograph From Indifference to Activism; Swedish Diplomacy and the Holocaust, 1938– 1944,. Levine pursued his work in Uppsala, Sweden. His main preoccupation was writing and teaching about the Holocaust. Working on his book, Raoul Wallenberg and Swedish diplomacy in Budapest in 1944–1945, Levine helped to understand Raoul Wallenberg in his real context, destroying existing myths about the Swedish hero.

Publications

As single author 
 Raoul Wallenberg in Budapest; Myth, History & Holocaust (Vallentine Mitchell, London, UK and Portland,US, 2010.
 From Indifference to Activism; Swedish Diplomacy and the Holocaust, 1938– 1944, (Acta Universitatis Upsaliensis, Studia Historica Upsaliensia), 1996. [In Sweden, doctoral dissertations are published.]

Co-author 
 Bruchfeld, Stéphane, and Levine, Paul A., Om detta må ni berätta; en bok om Förintelsen i Europa 1933– 1945, 5th and revised edition, med ett nytt kapital om Sverige och Förintelsen, 2009.
 Tell Ye Your Children, by Stéphane Bruchfeld and Paul A. Levine,

Other publications
 Series: The Hugo Valentin Lectures, No.: 6 (VIII-IX), Series Editor: Paul A. Levine, Number of pages: 49 pp., Format: 130x205 mm, softback, published: May 2013, ISSN 1651-6265, .

Prizes and stipends received 
 The Raoul Wallenberg Centennial Medal 2012, Awarded in Buenos Aires for my book—"Raoul Wallenberg in Budapest; Myth, History & Holocaust" (2010), by the Raoul Wallenberg International Foundation; Buenos Aires, November 2012. This prize was supported by the Swedish Embassy, Bueno Aires.
 Martin Henriksson Holmdahl, with Stéphane Bruchfeld, for service to Uppsala University and to Holocaust education and research in Sweden. Jan 2010.

Further reading 
 Bystanders to the Holocaust; A Re-Evaluation, (Frank Cass, London), 2002. Levine, Paul A., introduction and conclusion.
 Karlsson, Klas-Göran, "Tell Ye Your Children…": The Twisted Swedish Road to Holocaust Recognition, in SCANDINAVIAN-CANADIAN STUDIES/ÉTUDES SCANDINAVES AU CANADA Vol. 23 (2016) pp. 78–94.
 "Raoul Wallenberg and Swedish Humanitarian Policy in Budapest", in Reaching a State of Hope; Refugees, Immigrants, and the Swedish Welfare State, 1930– 2000", M. Byström & P. Frohnert (eds.), (Lund, 2013).
 "Sweden’s Complicated Neutrality and the Rescue of Denmark’s Jews", The Routledge History of the Holocaust, Friedman, J.C. (ed.)
 The Lessons of Nazism: Swedish Experiences in the Wake of the Second World War, with an English summary], (Stockholm: Atlantis)
 “Teaching about “The Perpetrator” in a Global Context”, Forum21: European Journal on Child and Youth Policy, Council of Europe, August 2009.
 “Sweden”, “Denmark", "Norway", "Raoul Wallenberg", four entries on these subjects to "Dictionnaire de la Shoah", Larousse Publishers, Paris (2009).
"One Day during the Holocaust; An Analysis of Raoul Wallenberg’s Budapest report of 12 September 1944", in R. Björk, Alf W. Johansson (eds), Samtidshistoria och politik, (Stockholm, 2004).
Dagens Nyheter, Om detta ville Paul A Levine berätta, 2019-11-17.
Andersson, Lars M., „Paul A. Levine in memoriam", 2019-11-17.
Yehuda Bauer, IHRA, Task Force on Holocaust Research, WW2, Genocide Studies.

References 

Historians of the Holocaust
2019 deaths
American historians
1956 births
American emigrants to Sweden
Historians of Sweden
Academic staff of Uppsala University
The Holocaust and Sweden